Cirrhochrista annulifera is a moth in the cultCrambidae. It is found in Papua New Guinea, on the D'Entrecasteaux Islands (Fergusson Island, Goodenough Island) and in Australia, where it has been recorded from  Western Australia, the Northern Territory and Queensland.

The larvae probably feed on Ficus species.

References

Moths described in 1919
Spilomelinae
Moths of New Guinea
Moths of Australia